Potrock Run is a  long 1st order tributary to Cross Creek in Brooke County, West Virginia.  This is the only stream of this name in the United States.

Course
Potrock Run rises at Fowlerstown, West Virginia, in Brooke County, West Virginia and then flows generally north to join Cross Creek about 1 mile east of Louise, West Virginia.

Watershed
Potrock Run drains  of area, receives about 40.1 in/year of precipitation, has a wetness index of 275.88, and is about 69% forested.

See also
List of Rivers of West Virginia

References

Rivers of West Virginia
Rivers of Brooke County, West Virginia